Gregory M. Zanon (born June 5, 1980) is a Canadian former professional ice hockey defenseman who played almost 500 games in the National Hockey League (NHL).

Playing career
Greg Zanon was drafted in the fifth round, 156th overall, in the 2000 NHL Entry Draft by the Ottawa Senators. He played four seasons, from 1999 to 2003, for the University of Nebraska at Omaha in the CCHA and was named to the CCHA First All-Star Team in 2001.

Unsigned from the Senators, Zanon played three seasons for the Milwaukee Admirals of the American Hockey League, an affiliate of the Nashville Predators. It wasn't until the 2005–06 season that he finally broke into the NHL, when he played four games for the Predators. Zanon rose in the NHL as a top player in the blocked shots statistic. He had 189 blocked shots in the 2007–08 NHL season.

On July 1, 2009, Zanon signed a three-year deal with the Minnesota Wild. His first season with the Wild in 2009–10 was largely successful, while proving a reliable physical force he also registered a career high 13 assists and 15 points in 81 games.

In the last year of his contract with the Wild in the 2011–12 season, Zanon fell out of favour and was relegated as a healthy scratch in 7 games. He appeared in only 39 contests before he was dealt at the trade deadline to the Boston Bruins for Steven Kampfer, on February 27, 2012.

On July 1, 2012, Zanon signed as a free agent to a two-year deal worth $4.5 million with the Colorado Avalanche. In the lockout-shortened 2012–13 season, Zanon made his Avalanche debut, recording an assist in an opening night defeat to the Minnesota Wild on January 19, 2013. As a fixture on the Avalanche defense, Zanon was unable to replicate his earlier puck-clearing career form; however, he finished the season to lead the team with 122 blocked shots in 44 games.

On July 3, 2013, the Avalanche placed Zanon, alongside Matt Hunwick, on waivers. Upon clearing waivers, the Avalanche then exercised the option to buy out the remaining year of his contract on July 4, 2013. As a result of the buyout, the Avalanche paid Zanon $1.5 million (being two-thirds of his remaining salary) and he became an unrestricted free agent. Unable to attract an NHL offer as a free agent, Zanon signed a professional try-out contract with the San Antonio Rampage of the AHL. As an alternate captain for the Rampage, Zanon returned to the AHL for the first time since 2007.

On July 8, 2014, Zanon was signed as a free agent by the Florida Panthers of the NHL to a one-year, two-way contract Zanon was returned to continue with AHL affiliate, the San Antonio Rampage. As team captain, Zanon appeared in 74 games and contributed offensively with his highest points totals in 10 years with 23. At the conclusion of the 2014–15 season, Zanon ended his professional career after 12 seasons.

Career statistics

Awards and honours

References

External links

1980 births
Living people
Boston Bruins players
Canadian ice hockey defencemen
Colorado Avalanche players
Ice hockey people from British Columbia
Milwaukee Admirals players
Minnesota Wild players
Nashville Predators players
Omaha Mavericks men's ice hockey players
Ottawa Senators draft picks
San Antonio Rampage players
Sportspeople from Burnaby
Victoria Salsa players
AHCA Division I men's ice hockey All-Americans